Dragaredokko is the name of an opera by the Norwegian composer Geirr Tveitt, performed in 1940. The entire score was destroyed in a fire in 1970, but an incomplete piano transcription still exists in the National Library of Norway.

References 

Compositions by Geirr Tveitt
Operas
1940 operas
Norwegian-language operas